Dodd is an unincorporated community in Tobin Township, Perry County, in the U.S. state of Indiana.

History
A post office was established at Dodd in 1898, and remained in operation until 1935. A member of the Dodd family served as an early postmaster.

Geography

References

Unincorporated communities in Perry County, Indiana
Unincorporated communities in Indiana